Sixten Totzek (born 1 January 2000) is a German curler from Rastatt, Germany. He currently skips the German National Men's Curling Team.

Career
Totzek played in four World Junior-B Curling Championships from 2016–2019 as third and fourth for Team Germany. In 2016 and 2017, he played third for Marc Muskatewitz and in 2018 and 2019, he threw fourth stones for Klaudius Harsch. The team lost the qualifying games in 2016 and 2017 before winning the bronze medal game at the 2018 World Junior B Curling Championships, sending them to the 2018 World Junior Curling Championships. At the championship, the team just missed the playoffs with a 4–5 record after losing their final round robin draw to Canada's Tyler Tardi. Their fifth place finish earned the team a spot at the 2019 World Junior Curling Championships without having to qualify through the B Championship. They did not have a good performance at the 2019 championship, finishing with a 3–6 round robin record and being relegated to the B Championship for the following season. They would, however, qualify again through the 2019 World Junior-B Curling Championships in December 2019 to secure a spot at the 2020 World Junior Curling Championships. There, Totzek would have his best finish to date, qualifying for the playoffs for the first time with a 6–3 record. They then lost to Canada's Jacques Gauthier in the semifinal 7–4 and Scotland's James Craik in the bronze medal game 6–5, settling for fourth place.

Totzek competed in his first European Curling Championship in 2018 as third for the German team. There, his team qualified for the playoffs as the fourth seed with a 5–4 record. They then lost to Sweden's Niklas Edin 6–3 in the semifinal and Italy's Joël Retornaz 8–6 in the bronze medal game, finishing fourth. Despite not winning a medal, the team did qualify Germany for the 2019 World Men's Curling Championship, which Totzek did not participate in. The next season, the team played in the 2019 European Curling Championships, finishing with a 3–6 record. The team was set to represent Germany at the 2020 World Men's Curling Championship before the event was cancelled due to the COVID-19 pandemic.

For the 2020–21 season, Totzek began skipping the German team. His team represented Germany at the 2021 World Men's Curling Championship in Calgary, Alberta where they finished with a 4–9 record.

Personal life
Totzek is a student.

Teams

References

External links

2000 births
Living people
German male curlers
People from Rastatt
People from Baden-Baden
Sportspeople from Karlsruhe (region)
21st-century German people